Ali on the Run is a fitness podcast hosted by race announcer, blogger and former journalist Ali Feller. Over the podcast's more than five hundred episodes, Feller's subjects have ranged from everyday runners to Olympic marathoners, and she talks about issues that face the entire running community. The podcast is amongst the top running podcasts and is ranked as the #1 running podcast by Chartable. Feller lives in New Hampshire, but began her podcast in 2017 while living in New Jersey, following a career writing for a number of fitness and dance publications.

Host
Ali Feller was raised in Hopkinton, New Hampshire and began running when she was living in New York City after college and couldn't afford a gym membership. She is an announcer for New Hampshire-based Millennium Running and has announced for World Marathon Major races, including the New York City Marathon and Boston Marathon. Ali is married to entrepreneur Brian Cristiano and together they have a daughter, Annie.

See also
List of health and wellness podcasts

References

External links

Sports podcasts
2017 podcast debuts
American podcasters
American women podcasters
Health and wellness podcasts